Roman Vladimirovich Yezhov (born 2 September 1997) is a Russian professional footballer who plays as a right winger for PFC Krylia Sovetov Samara and the Russia national team.

Club career
He made his professional debut in the Russian Professional Football League for FC Chertanovo Moscow on 29 September 2014 in a game against FC Fakel Voronezh. He made his Russian Football National League debut for Chertanovo on 17 July 2018 in a game against FC Rotor Volgograd.

He made his Russian Premier League debut for PFC Krylia Sovetov Samara on 25 July 2021 in a game against FC Akhmat Grozny.

International career
He was called up to the Russia national football team for the first time in October 2021 for the World Cup qualifiers against Cyprus and Croatia. He was included in the extended 41-players list of candidates. He made his debut on 24 September 2022 in a friendly game against Kyrgyzstan.

Career statistics

References

External links
 
 
 

1997 births
People from Nizhnekamsk
Sportspeople from Tatarstan
Living people
Russian footballers
Russia youth international footballers
Russia international footballers
Association football midfielders
FC Chertanovo Moscow players
PFC Krylia Sovetov Samara players
Russian Premier League players
Russian First League players
Russian Second League players